McKinsey's Marvin Bower: Vision, Leadership and the Creation of Management Consulting is a book by Elizabeth Haas Edersheim, one of the first female partners of McKinsey. The book is about Marvin Bower, McKinsey visionary leader who transformed the company from an accounting and engineering practice into one of the world's premier management consulting firms and who is considered to be the founder of management consulting.

The book has a very positive feedback from the consultant community. Particularly, Peter F. Drucker said the book "makes Marvin come to life and perpetuates him as a role model".

References
 (official website of the book)

Biographies about businesspeople
2004 non-fiction books
Wiley (publisher) books